Kapor may refer to:

 Freada Kapor Klein (born 1952), American criminologist
 Milovan Kapor (born 1991), Canadian soccer player
 Mitch Kapor (born 1950), American businessperson
 Mladen Kapor (born 1966), Yugoslav swimmer
 Momo Kapor (born 1937), Serbian novelist
 Kapor, the Hungarian name for Copru village, Cătina Commune, Cluj County, Romania